John Geekie was the British governor of Bombay for 12 days between 15 and 26 November 1742, during the rule of the Honourable East India Company.

References
The India list and India Office list 

Governors of Bombay
Year of death unknown
Year of birth unknown